Mionectes is a genus of birds in the tyrant flycatcher family Tyrannidae.

The genus was erected in 1844 by the German ornithologist Jean Cabanis with the streak-necked flycatcher (Mionectes striaticollis) as the type species.

Species
The genus contains the following seven species:

The Tepui flycatcher was formerly considered conspecific with McConnell's flycatcher. The two species have similar plumage but differ in their vocalisation and display behaviour.

References

 
Bird genera
Taxonomy articles created by Polbot